Alypia ridingsii, the mountain forester or Ridings' forester, is a moth of the family Noctuidae. The species was first described by Augustus Radcliffe Grote in 1864. It is found in North America as far east as the eastern edge of the Rocky Mountains in Colorado. It is also found in Arizona, Utah, all of California and northward into Oregon, Idaho, Washington, British Columbia and Alaska

The wingspan is about 30 mm. Adults are on wing from March to May in California and as late as June in the more northern and eastern parts of its range.

The larvae feed on Camissonia bistorta, Camissonia californica, Camissonia dentata  and Clarkia rhomboidea.

References

"Agaristinae New Genus 1 ridingsii Grote". Noctuidae of North America. Retrieved November 14, 2020.

Agaristinae
Moths of North America
Moths described in 1864
Taxa named by Augustus Radcliffe Grote